The All-Ireland Senior B Hurling Championship of 1985 was the 12th staging of Ireland's secondary hurling knock-out competition.  London won the championship, beating Meath 1-8 to 1-6 in the final at St. Loman's Park, Trim.

References

 Donegan, Des, The Complete Handbook of Gaelic Games (DBA Publications Limited, 2005).

1985
B